"First We Take Manhattan" is a song written by Canadian singer-songwriter Leonard Cohen. It was originally recorded by American singer Jennifer Warnes on her 1986 Cohen tribute album Famous Blue Raincoat, which consisted entirely of songs written or co-written by Cohen.

Meaning
The song's oblique lyrics are suggestive of religious and end time themes, with references to prayer, meaningful birthmarks and signs in the sky. Writing for The Guardian in 2015, Ben Hewitt drew attention to the lyrics' apocalyptic nature, imagining Cohen "greedily eyeing world domination like a Bond villain". Rolling Stone magazine's Mikal Gilmore similarly described the song as a threatening vision of "social collapse and a terrorist's revenge". The Daily Telegraphs Robert Sandall likewise observed the prophetic character of the song, but emphasized the song's political statement, placing it in the context of the last days of the Soviet Union.

Cohen explained himself in a backstage interview at 1988: "I think it means exactly what it says. It is a terrorist song. I think it's a response to terrorism. There's something about terrorism that I've always admired. The fact that there are no alibis or no compromises. That position is always very attractive. I don't like it when it's manifested on the physical plane – I don't really enjoy the terrorist activities – but Psychic Terrorism. I remember there was a great poem by Irving Layton that I once read, I'll give you a paraphrase of it. It was 'well, you guys blow up an occasional airline and kill a few children here and there', he says. 'But our terrorists, Jesus, Freud, Marx, Einstein. The whole world is still quaking.'"

Jennifer Warnes version 

Warnes' original recording is notable for the distinctive driving lead guitar played by Stevie Ray Vaughan.  Producer Roscoe Beck was from Austin, Texas and friends with Vaughan.  In late February 1986, at the annual Grammy Awards in Los Angeles, Beck asked Vaughan to record the guitar for the song. In a 2007 interview, Beck recalls that Vaughan did not have his guitar or amp with him, and used one of Beck's old Strats instead. After working on a few technical problems, the finished recording was achieved after two or three takes.  According to Jennifer Warnes' official site, Vaughan finished recording his takes at 4:00a.m.

Music video 

The music video for Warnes' version of "First We Take Manhattan" was directed by Paula Walker.  Filmed in New York City, the video features Stevie Ray Vaughan playing his weathered "Number One" guitar (with its distinctive "SRV" logo) on the Brooklyn Bridge. Cohen also appears with Warnes in the video. The 20th anniversary edition of the music video contains a German intro about the West Berlin discotheque bombing.

The album version of the song is 3:47 in length, whereas the single is 3:32 long. A promotional 12-inch single version, entitled "Jennifer Warnes — First We Take Manhattan, Radio Remix — featuring Stevie Ray Vaughan", contained extended and edited versions.

Personnel 

 Vocals – Jennifer Warnes
 Lead guitar – Stevie Ray Vaughan
 Guitar – Robben Ford
 Bass guitar – Roscoe Beck
 Drums – Vinnie Colaiuta
 Percussion – Lenny Castro
 Synthesizer – Russell Ferrante
 Synthesizer programmed by – Gary Chang

Leonard Cohen version

Leonard Cohen's own quasi-synth-pop version of "First We Take Manhattan" (with additional verses) was released in 1988 as the first track on his album I'm Your Man. Cohen's then-girlfriend, Dominique Issermann, shot a black and white promotional video for Cohen's version of the track.

On his 1988 tour, instead of the original, Euro-disco-influenced arrangement of his studio version, Cohen introduced the new, funk-influenced arrangement, suggested by his backing singers Perla Batalla and Julie Christensen. He continued to perform the song this way in 1993, 2008 and 2009 tours.

Cohen's studio recording plays over the closing credits of the 2009 film Watchmen.

Personnel 

 Jeff Fisher – arranger and performer
 Leonard Cohen – vocals and production
 Anjani – vocals
 Peter Kisilenko – Bass

Other cover versions 

The song has been covered dozens of times. Most notably, R.E.M. contributed a cover for the Cohen tribute album I'm Your Fan (1991). Their presence on the compilation led to a re-arranging of the I'm Your Fan track list. In the US release of the tribute, R.E.M.'s cover appeared as the first track, rather than House of Love's "Who by Fire" which was the starting track in all other countries. The song also appeared as a B-side on some versions of the single "Drive".

Joe Cocker covered "First We Take Manhattan" on his 1999 album No Ordinary World.

Charts

Jennifer Warnes version

R.E.M. version

References 

1987 singles
1987 songs
1988 singles
Ariola Records singles
Black-and-white music videos
Columbia Records singles
Jennifer Warnes songs
Joe Cocker songs
Leonard Cohen songs
R.E.M. songs
Songs about New York City
Songs written by Leonard Cohen
Warren Zevon songs
Works about terrorism